UFC 232: Jones vs. Gustafsson 2 was a mixed martial arts event produced by the Ultimate Fighting Championship that was held on December 29, 2018 at The Forum in Inglewood, California.

Background
A UFC Light Heavyweight Championship bout between former champion Jon Jones and former title challenger Alexander Gustafsson headlined this event. As the current divisional champion Daniel Cormier focused on defending his UFC Heavyweight Championship, the promotion indicated that he would be stripped of his title and that the winner of the proposed Jones/Gustafsson bout would become the undisputed champion. Jones and Gustafsson previously fought in September of 2013 at UFC 165 where Jones defended his title via unanimous decision. The rematch was previously booked to headline UFC 178 in September of 2014, but the pairing was scrapped after Gustafsson tore his right meniscus and lateral collateral ligament. A day before the event, Cormier relinquished his title as he said "I'd rather walk away this way, than have the history books say I was stripped".

The event was originally expected to take place at T-Mobile Arena in Paradise, Nevada, part of the Las Vegas Metropolitan Area. However on December 23, the event was moved to The Forum in Inglewood, California due to a Jones' drug testing abnormality stemming from earlier that month. The test found a trace amount of turinabol in Jones' system, the same substance he tested positive for in 2017 that led to the 15-month suspension he recently was cleared from in order to fight this week. Because the Nevada State Athletic Commission does not have proper time to investigate in order to keep Jones cleared to fight in Las Vegas, the UFC decided to move the entire event to Inglewood as the California State Athletic Commission would grant Jones a licence. UFC VP of Athlete Health and Performance Jeff Novitzky said USADA, in consultation with other organizations, believes the test is a "pulsing" effect and not a new ingestion of the substance that he tested positive for after UFC 214 in July 2017.

A UFC Women's Featherweight Championship bout between current champion Cris Cyborg (who is also a former Strikeforce Women's Featherweight Champion and Invicta FC Featherweight Champion) and current UFC Women's Bantamweight Champion Amanda Nunes took place at the event. This was the fourth time in UFC history that champions in different divisions fought for the same title, following UFC 94, UFC 205 and UFC 226. 

A women's flyweight bout between Sijara Eubanks and Jessica Eye was expected to take place at this event, but Eubanks was pulled from the bout on October 2 in favor of a headliner for the vacant UFC Women's Flyweight Championship against former UFC Women's Bantamweight Championship challenger Valentina Shevchenko at UFC 230. However, that fight was canceled a week later. Eubanks remained on the card at UFC 230 and fought against former title challenger Roxanne Modafferi, while Eye found a new opponent at UFC 231.

Tom Duquesnoy was expected to face Nathaniel Wood at the event. However, Duquesnoy pulled out of the fight on November 12 citing a rib injury. Wood then faced Andre Ewell.

A bantamweight bout between Brian Kelleher and Montel Jackson was initially slated to take place at UFC 230. However the fight was cancelled on the day of the event due to a medical issue for Kelleher and was rescheduled for this event. At the weigh-ins, Jackson weighed in at 137 lb, 1 pound over the bantamweight non-title fight limit of 136 lb. He was fined 20% of his fight purse, and Kelleher proceeded at catchweight.

Results

Bonus awards
The following fighters were awarded $50,000 bonuses:
 Fight of the Night: Chad Mendes vs. Alexander Volkanovski
Performance of the Night: Amanda Nunes and Ryan Hall

Reported payout
The following is the reported payout to the fighters as reported to the California State Athletic Commission. It does not include sponsor money and also does not include the UFC's traditional "fight night" bonuses. The total disclosed payout for the event was $3,506,000.

 Jon Jones: $500,000 (no win bonus) def. Alexander Gustafsson: $500,000
 Amanda Nunes: $350,000 (no win bonus) def. Cris Cyborg: $500,000
 Michael Chiesa: $96,000 ($48,000 win bonus) def. Carlos Condit: $115,000
 Corey Anderson: $130,000 ($65,000 win bonus) def. Ilir Latifi: $90,000
 Alexander Volkanovski: $125,000 ($60,000 win bonus) def. Chad Mendes: $87,000
 Walt Harris: $72,000 ($36,000 win bonus; fined 4,000) def. Andrei Arlovski: $300,000
 Megan Anderson: $60,000 ($30,000 win bonus) def. Cat Zingano: $50,000
 Petr Yan: $52,000 ($26,000 win bonus) def. Douglas Silva de Andrade: $21,000
 Ryan Hall: $38,000 ($19,000 win bonus) def. B.J. Penn: $150,000
 Nathaniel Wood: $24,000 ($12,000 win bonus) def. Andre Ewell: $12,000
 Uriah Hall: $110,000 ($55,000 win bonus) def. Bevon Lewis: $12,000
 Curtis Millender: $36,000 ($18,000 win bonus) def. Siyar Bahadurzada: $33,000
 Montel Jackson: $16,000* ($10,000 win bonus) def. Brian Kelleher: $27,000

* Montel Jackson was fined $4,000, 20 percent of his purse for failing to make the required weight for his fight with Brian Kelleher. That money will be issued to Kelleher.

Aftermath

Nunes became the first woman to be champion in two divisions simultaneously and third fighter overall (after Conor McGregor at UFC 205 and Daniel Cormier at UFC 226), as well as the sixth person overall to win a title in different divisions.

On January 23, 2019, it was reported that Walt Harris failed a fight-night drug test and was temporarily suspended by the CSAC. He tested positive for LGD-4033, a muscle-wasting medication in the same family of selective androgen receptor modulators (SARMs) like ostarine. On February 28, Harris was suspended for four months (retroactive to the day of the fight) and fined $4,000 by the CSAC for the failed drug test, as he was able prove that he ingested the substance via a tainted supplement. His fight against former UFC Heavyweight Champion Andrei Arlovski was overturned to a no contest.

See also
 List of UFC events
 2018 in UFC
 List of current UFC fighters

References 

Ultimate Fighting Championship events
Events in Inglewood, California
2018 in mixed martial arts
Mixed martial arts in California
Mixed martial arts in Los Angeles
2018 in sports in California
December 2018 sports events in the United States